Jinnah Naval Base is a strategic naval base of the Pakistan Navy located at Ormara, Balochistan, Pakistan. It is named after Pakistan's founder, Mohammad Ali Jinnah. It is Pakistan's second largest naval base.

Location
Jinnah Naval Base is situated about 240 km west (149 miles) of Karachi at Ormara in Pakistan's Balochistan province. By land, via the Makran Coastal Highway it is 350 km (217.48 miles) from Karachi and 285 km from Gwadar.

Construction history

The Ministry of Defence approved the proposal of constructing of the naval base away from the maritime boundaries of India, and initially awarded the contract to two European countries–Belgium and Turkey– with the ground breaking ceremony taking place on 17 March 1994. The project was aimed towards spending ₨. 4.5Bn  (500Mn. USD), and the contract was awarded to Turkish firms, STFA Group and STM, Belgium firm, Jan De Nul, and Pakistani firms, FWO and MES.

The project was timelined for a naval base to be operational by March 1997.

On 22 June 2000, the Jinnah Naval Base was inaugurated by then-Chief Executive Gen. Pervez Musharraf in a ceremony attended by Faruk Bal, the Turkish Minister of State, and V-Adm. Taj Muhammad. Gen. Musharraf had termed the opening of the base as a long-standing requirement of the Pakistan Navy and had become a reality after many years of hard work.

Work on selection of the site for the Jinnah Naval Base commenced in 1990. The contract was awarded to Turkish company STFA and Jan De Nul of Belgium for offshore and land development in December 1992. Construction of the Base began in 1994 and the Base was inaugurated on 22 January 2000 by General Pervez Musharraf. The Base was constructed at a cost of Rs. 4.5 billion.

Salient features
Jinnah Naval Base can provide berthing facilities to eight warships and four submarines at a time. This facility can be expanded in future with the expansion of the Base. The Base is currently in the process of modernization to meet Pakistan's increasing defence needs. To develop future naval officers, Cadet College Ormara has been established.

Submarine base
In April 2014, Pakistan Navy announced that it is in the process of shifting primary operations and naval assets, including its entire fleet of diesel-electric submarines (SSKs), from Karachi to the Jinnah Naval Base in Ormara.

See also 
 PNS Ahsan
 PNS Makran
 PNS Mehran
 PNS Qasim
 Karachi Naval Dockyard
 Karachi Shipyard

References 

Pakistan Navy bases
Military installations in Balochistan, Pakistan
Pakistan Navy submarine bases
Memorials to Muhammad Ali Jinnah
Ormara